"This Magic Moment" is a song written by Doc Pomus and Mort Shuman, originally performed by The Drifters

This Magic Moment may also refer to:
 This Magic Moment, album by Earl Grant
 This Magic Moment, a 2013 Hallmark Channel Original Movie
 "This Magic Moment", a television episode of ESPN's 30 for 30 concerning the Orlando Magic
 "This Magic Moment" (Grey's Anatomy), a television episode from the series Grey's Anatomy
 This Magic Moment, a novel by Gregg Easterbrook
 This Magic Moment, a novel by Nora Roberts
 This Magic Moment, a short film by Lorraine Nicholson

See also 
 "That Magic Moment", a television episode of Dexter's Laboratory
 Magic Moment (disambiguation)